Baker Heights is an unincorporated community near Opequon Creek in Berkeley County in the U.S. state of West Virginia. Located on West Virginia Route 9 southeast of Martinsburg, Baker Heights is the site of the Martinsburg Veterans Affairs Medical Center.

External links 

Martinsburg VA Medical Center

Unincorporated communities in Berkeley County, West Virginia
Unincorporated communities in West Virginia